Dorothee Martin (born 21 January 1978) is a German politician for the Social Democratic Party (SPD) who has been serving as a member of the Bundestag since 2020, representing the Hamburg-Nord district.

Early life and education
Martin was born 1978 in the West German town of Kaiserslautern and studied political sciences and law at the University of Hamburg.

Political career
Martin entered the SPD in 1998 and was from 2011 to 2020 a member of the Hamburg Parliament, the unicameral legislature of the federal city state of Hamburg.

In May 2020 Martin was the replacement after the recession of Johannes Kahrs as member of the Bundestag. She was elected in the constituency of Hamburg-Nord at the 2021 German federal election.

Since the 2021 elections, Martin has been serving as her parliamentary group’s spokesperson for transport.

Other activities
 Deutsche Bahn, Member of the Supervisory Board (since 2022)
 Federal Network Agency for Electricity, Gas, Telecommunications, Posts and Railway (BNetzA), Alternate Member of the Rail Infrastructure Advisory Council (since 2022)

References

1978 births
Living people
People from Kaiserslautern
Members of the Bundestag for Hamburg
Lesbian politicians
LGBT members of the Bundestag
German LGBT politicians
Members of the Bundestag 2017–2021
Members of the Bundestag 2021–2025
Members of the Bundestag for the Social Democratic Party of Germany
Female members of the Bundestag
21st-century LGBT people
21st-century German women politicians